Tin Can Bay is a coastal town and locality in the Wide Bay–Burnett region in Queensland, Australia. The locality is split between the Fraser Coast Region (the northern part of the locality) and the Gympie Region (southern part of the locality), but the town itself is within Gympie Region.

Geography 
The locality of Tin Can Bay is bounded on the east by the Great Sandy Strait, which separates mainland Queensland from Fraser Island. The area is a Ramsar Convention wetland of International Importance and an Important Bird Area of Australia.

The town is located on a peninsula between Snapper Creek and the Great Sandy Strait.

A vehicular ferry operates at nearby Inskip Point providing access to Fraser Island.

History 
The town was originally called Wallu, but was changed to Tin Can Bay in 1937. The origins of "Tin Can" are uncertain, but is believed to be derived from an indigenous name, possibly tinchin meaning mangrove in the Yugarabul dialect of the Yuggera language, or tinken meaning vine with large ribbed leaves from Doombarah Clan, Dulinbara dialect, Kabi language.

European settlement began in the 1870s as the point where logs would be floated to the timber mills at Maryborough.  Tin Can Bay later became, and still remains, an important fishing port, with a focus on prawns as well as recreational fishing.

Wallu State School opened on 1 February 1934 and was renamed Tin Can Bay State School in 1937.

The Tin Can Bay Library opened in 1985 and underwent a major refurbishment in 2005.

Tin Can Bay was formerly in the Shire of Cooloola until its amalgamation in 2008 into the Gympie Region.

Heritage listings 
Tin Can Bay has a number of heritage-listed sites, including:
 Cod Street: Tin Can Bay Picnic Shelter
 Gympie Road: Tin Can Bay Memorial Hall
 22 – 24 Gympie Road: Tin Can Bay Church
 Tin Can Bay Road: Wide Bay Military Reserve

Education 
Tin Can Bay State School is a government primary and secondary (Prep-10) school for boys and girls at 2 Schnapper Creek Road. In 2018, the school had an enrolment of 271 students with 26 teachers (24 full-time equivalent) and 22 non-teaching staff (15 full-time equivalent). It includes a special education program. 

For secondary schooling to Year 12, the nearest government secondary school is Gympie State High School in Gympie to the south-west.

Amenities 

The Gympie Regional Council operate a public library at the park on Tin Can Bay Road.

The Tin Can Bay branch of the Queensland Country Women's Association meets at 18 Whiting Street.

Tin Can Bay Country Club  is at 222 Tin Can Bay Road.

Cooloola Coast Bowls Club is at 4463 Gympie Road.

There are boat ramps in the locality, located at:

 Norman Park boat ramp, managed by the Transport and Main Roads
 Toolara Road on the north bank of Teewah Creek, managed by the Gympie Regional Council

Attractions 

The seaside town is a popular holiday destination. Recreational facilities include hotels, holiday units and caravan parks, with houseboats and yachts for hire and a marina. Active sports facilities include an 18-hole golf course, two bowls clubs, tennis courts and an outdoor swimming pool.

An important tourist feature is the regular arrival of wild Australian humpback dolphins which usually appear early mornings next to the Norman Point boat ramp. These dolphins can be hand fed under close supervision. Bird watching is another popular activity as Tin Can Bay is home to a wide variety of birds.

Events 
Each September the town hosts the Tin Can Bay Seafood Festival, a day of family fun, with entertainment, novelty competitions such as mullet throwing and prawn eating, helicopter joy flights over the bay, seafood and market stalls.

Other events throughout the year include the Bay to Bay Yacht Race, Dragonboat Regatta, Cooloola Coast Flower Show and the Foreshore Family Carnival from Boxing Day to New Year's Eve.

See also
 List of tramways in Queensland

References

External links

 University of Queensland: Queensland Places: Tin Can Bay

Towns in Queensland
Bays of Queensland
Gympie Region
Fraser Coast Region
Localities in Queensland